Lineup, line up or line-up may refer to:

Groupings
 A queue area of waiting people
 A police lineup, or identity parade, of suspects
 The roster of a sports team at a given time
 Batting order (baseball) in baseball
 The starting position in polocrosse
 The members of a music band at a given time
 The acts performing at a concert or music festival

Titles
 The Lineup (TV program), a legal and current affairs show on Fox News Channel
 Line Up (TV series), a South Korean TV show on SBS Channel
 "Line Up" (song), a 1994 single by the British band Elastica
 Line-Up (Graham Bonnet album), 1981
 Line-up (Battlefield Band album), 2011
 The Lineup (TV series), a 1950s American television series
 The Lineup (film), a 1958 American film based on the series

See also
 Late Night Line-Up, BBC television programme which ran 1964–72, also known as Line-Up